The MWM AKD 112 Z is an air-cooled two-cylinder inline diesel engine produced by MWM from 1955 – 1960. One, three and four cylinder variants of the same engine family were also produced by MWM.

Description 

The AKD 112 Z is an air-cooled, two-cylinder, four stroke diesel engine with overhead valves. The letter Z means Zweizylinder, German for two cylinders.

The crankcase is a single cast piece, the drop-forged crankshaft with screwed on counter weights is supported in bearings made of steel-lead-bronze. The crank and shaft pins of the crankshaft are heat-hardened. Due to the air-cooling of the engine, the cylinders have cooling fins made of centrifugal cast metal. The combustion chamber of the engine is a part of the piston bowls, as the engine is direct-injected. The pistons are made of a special highly heat resistant light metal alloy, they have three piston rings and one oil control ring. The bigger conrod eyes are made of steel-lead-bronze, the upper smaller conrod eyes are made of special-bronze. The camshaft is supported by rolling bearings. The overhead valves are actuated by rockers and pushrods. The cylinder head is a single piece made of a chill cast, highly heat resistant light metal alloy. The engine's air filter is a wire-gauze type air filter. For dusty environments MWM offered an oilbath air filter. The air intake must not draw in hot air; this would reduce the engine's power output. The engine has a Bosch injection pump. It is controlled by a centrifugal control mechanism using a pushrod. The control trap makes it possible to change the injection time at the engine start-up to pump more fuel into the cylinder. A forced feed (wet sump) lubrication system lubricates the engine, powered by a gear oil pump. The oil is filtered by a strainer in the low pressure circuit, and a fine sieve strainer in the high pressure circuit. A gap filter in the high pressure circuit was also available. Being air-cooled, the AKD 112 Z has an axial cooling fan powered by the crankshaft using a belt. The power can be taken off the flywheel or the PTO-shaft. An electric motor can be used to start the engine, but a crank starting is standard. The AKD 112 Z has a decompression starting aid system. Being direct-injected, it does not have glowplugs.

References

Bibliography 

Betriebsanleitung für den luftgekühlten Klein-Dieselmotor AKD 112 Ein und Zweizylinder. MWM Motoren-Werke Mannheim AG. Vorm. Benz Abt. Stat. Motorenbau. June 1955 (German); Service manual for the air-cooled small diesel engine AKD 112 one and two-cylinders. MWM Motoren-Werke Mannheim AG. Formerly Benz Department for stationary engine development

Diesel_engines_by_model
Straight-twin engines